Old Boys: The Way of the Dragon (Chinese: 老男孩猛龙过江) is a farcical 2014 Chinese musical-comedy film directed and written by the Chopstick Brothers (Xiao Yang and Wang Taili) and also starring Jingjing Qu. It was released on 10 July 2014.

Plot
  
Two aspiring though over-the-hill Chinese brothers (Da Bao and Xiao Shuai) reminisce about when they were young, and how they still have dreams of becoming famous musicians (named "The Chopstick Brothers", after the actors in real life). Although middle aged, overweight, and past their prime, they dream that they will make it big in New York. Xiao Shuai lives with his father-in-law who calls him a failure. In mockery, patrons at the club where he performs frequently send him cartons of beer knowing that he will get drunk and get sick on stage. As he goes through these stage rituals, it is depressing to him and intensifies his feelings of failure.

A flashback reveals that while younger and playing at a bar, a woman came up to Da Bao and kissed him. They started dating for a while, but eventually she left him to go New York to pursue her dreams. Back in the present, Da Bao gets fired as being over the hill. Outside, a western "Musician manager" named Chris approached Da Bao, alluringly saying he had talent, and could make it in New York on a TV show "Voice of an Angel" (a show much like American Idol). To do so, the Chopstick Brothers must reunite, and pay a 100,000 RMB "Consulting fee". After some reluctance and discussion, they agree to do it and Da Bao borrows money from his Father in order to pay the consulting fee.

They leave for New York, where a mob lieutenant is with the spoiled and temperamental mob boss Daughter of a recently deceased mob boss. The man is now in a position to take over the Mob and tries to form a relationship with the mob boss Daughter to solidify his position. She asks him to prove to her that he is capable of doing so, and demands that he kill one of the Judges from "Voice of an angel" who had previously bounced her off the show. The judge is later revealed to be Da bao's old girlfriend, who has made it big in New York. The mob lieutenant goes to his mob friends and orders them could kill the judge for him. They said it was too high profile and that they need outsiders to do it. The mob decides to use two Korean assassin brothers, and they hire them to do the job.

Both the Korean assassins and the Chinese Chopstick Brothers arrive in New York at the same time and at the same security gate. One of the Chinese brothers says it's crazy that they have to go through security after getting off the plane. There is very high security with many armed guards surrounding the area, which causes the Koreans to be on edge. One of the Chinese brothers had an object resembling a bomb in one of the suitcases, causing an alarm go off while going through the X-Ray machine. One of the guards tells everyone to get down. The Koreans, thinking they had been found, stayed up and adopted a fighting stance. A guard rushes them shouting at them to get down, the Koreans throws the guard onto the ground. The rest of the guards raise their weapons, arresting them.

The Chinese got through security without a problem after that, waiting for Chris to pick them up, after a while, they called Chris, but he is in a bar drinking, he claims he was stuck in traffic, and he sent people to pick the two up. The mob then approaches the Chopstick Brothers thinking they are the assassins, saying they are there to pick them up. At the mob bosses hideout, one of the mobsters does lethal looking butterfly knife tricks which Da Baos briskly repeats from a stage act he knows and adds his own tricks, which deeply impress the on-looking mobsters. The mob boss then shows them a video of the TV-show Judge which shows her calling his Mob boss girlfriend a talentless sheep. Xiao Shuai, angered by the fact that Da Baos old girlfriend made it big in New York, said "Kill her, kill this bastard", further causing the mob boss to think that they were the Assassins. Because of their very poor English, the mobsters somehow conclude that the Chopstick brothers, who they think are the Korean assassins, plan to compete as performers on the show and to kill the judge at the end of their audition.

The Chopstick brothers are then brought to the judges at the show and introduce themselves with their very poor English pronunciation as the "JOBS" "DICKS" brothers, to the snickering amusement of some of the judges. During the competition, the Chopstick brothers perform in undersized neon pink dance jackets performing poorly synchronized dance moves, while singing the Chinese song "Little Apple" for the judges. They pull out fake guns at the end of the show which shoot ticker tape messages at the judges. The mobsters watching on a remote video, feel betrayed and plan to punish the Chopstick brothers. Meanwhile, the Chopstick brothers cannot win over the judges and Da Baos decides he must resort to sacrificing his high ethical standards by sleeping with the head producer, a Dominatrix, who then gets them on the main show on its biggest night.

The Chopstick brothers manage to evade the mobsters until the big performance night although they are roughed up in the process. They decide that their only chances are to bail out the previously apprehended Korean gangster brothers out of jail, and to let them take on and destroy the aggressive mob. This is done to allow them to compete on their big performance night. Mayhem breaks out when the aggressive mob decides to try to kill the Chopstick brothers during their main performance night though the Korean gangster brothers are able to intercede in order to fully defeat the entire mob and all of their members. The Chopstick brothers then return to China and their families without having made any progress in their careers. Upon return though, they discover that their families have come to mean much more to them upon their return from New York than before their adventure in America began.

Cast
Xiao Yang, as one of the two Chopstick brothers.
Wang Taili, as the other of two Chopstick brothers.
Qu Jingjing, as the girlfriend and current judge on the panel.
Wanting Qu

Soundtrack

The soundtrack for the film featured the viral Chinese hit song 'Little Apple'. This song has also attained high positions in main online charts in China. It peaked at number one in the CCTV Global Chinese Music Chart released every Saturday. This song, referred to by one commentator as a "brainwashing song", also brings up the psychological factors that contribute to its success—its simple rhythm and lyrics cause the "earworm effect", forcing people to listen to it over and over again, and another reason that lied underneath is the "snowball effect", which means that people tend to follow others in a trend, suggesting that some people may not actually like the song, but just blindly following others.

Reception
The film has grossed US$32.80 million in China.

References

2010s musical comedy films
Chinese musical comedy films
Le Vision Pictures films
2014 comedy films